Thumbakere  is a village in the southern state of Karnataka, India. It is located in the Mandya taluk of Mandya district in Karnataka.

Demographics
As of 2001 India census, Thumbakere had a population of 10183 with 5171 males and 5012 females.

Noted people
 Prajwal - Drinker

See also
 Mandya
 Districts of Karnataka

References

External links
 http://Mandya.nic.in/

Villages in Mandya district